Rayman M (Rayman Arena in North America and for the Xbox and GameCube versions) is a multiplayer party game developed and published by Ubisoft. The game encompasses two versions: the original version for the PlayStation 2 and Microsoft Windows, and the North American GameCube and Xbox versions, with each release featuring exclusive content. A spin-off of the Rayman series, the game retains a number of elements that previously appeared in Rayman 2: The Great Escape, such as similar controls, gameplay and level design. It is split into two game modes, both supporting up to four players: on-foot racing and arena-based battles.

The PlayStation 2 and Microsoft Windows versions require the player to complete all five leagues (Beginner, Advanced, Expert, Extreme and Bonus) to beat the game.

The GameCube and Xbox versions require the player to complete the four main game modes (Obstacle Racing, Time Attack, Total Fight and Freeze Combat) on all three difficulties (Beginner, Pro and Master) to beat the game.

A demake, titled Rayman Rush, was released for the PlayStation in 2002, which only features the racing portions of the game.

Versions

PlayStation 2 and Microsoft Windows
Rayman M was released in Europe in late 2001 for the PlayStation 2 and Microsoft Windows, and was released in North America for the PlayStation 2 and Microsoft Windows in September 2002 as Rayman Arena. There are very minor changes between the European and North American PlayStation 2 and Microsoft Windows releases (intro movie, load screens, etc.).

GameCube and Xbox
The PlayStation 2 and Microsoft Windows versions of the game were released worldwide, but the GameCube and Xbox versions were only released in North America under the name Rayman Arena. There were a number of changes made to the GameCube and Xbox releases, including:

 Increased framerate (60fps).
 A new main menu.
 A new intro and a new outro.
 New cutscenes where Murfy explains the basics of the different game types.
 Difficulty levels in the single player mode (Beginner, Pro and Master).
 Modified level designs for some levels.
 A new playable character (Dark Globox) and new unlockable skins (such as Dark Rayman).
 A new game mode (Time Attack).
 A new Race Exhibition level (Extreme Slide).
 Three new Battle Exhibition levels (Pac-Arena, Low Gravity Arena and Kuraï).
 Born to Slide and Speed Stress renamed to Speed Stress and Run, Run, respectively.
 Race, Lum Spring and Lum Fight renamed to Obstacle Racing, Freeze Combat and Total Fight, respectively.
 The removal of five game modes (Training, Popolopoï, Lums, Kill Time and Capture the Fly).
 The removal of two Bonus League race levels (Big Bang and On and On).
 Modified character themes for Globox and Tily for all race levels.
 New character themes for every character in the Factory race levels.

Rayman Rush

Rayman Rush is an on-foot racing game developed by Ubi Soft Shanghai and published by Ubi Soft. The game is a demake of Rayman M for the original PlayStation, but only features the racing half of the game. The Teensies were replaced with a new character (Globette), sports conversions of twelve race tracks (the level Treasure Ship was removed and replaced with Canopy) and a slightly edited introduction movie. The game only supports up to two players, due to the PlayStation's hardware limitations.

Reception

Rayman M received "mixed or average" reviews, according to review aggregator Metacritic. GameSpot gave a score of 5.1/10, criticizing the lack of gameplay variety, stating that "you typically need only two laps on a course to figure out a path through the level that will defeat the computer racers." Play Magazine gave the game a rating of 3 out of 5, stating "the racing is a blast for a few quick rounds, and the platforming elements are always a welcome addition. But it's not the kind of party game that lasts well past the immediate draw."

For the PC platform, Rayman M received "generally unfavorable" reviews, according to Metacritic.

Rayman Rush
Rayman Rush received "mixed or average" reviews, according to review aggregator Metacritic.

References

External links
 
 

2001 video games
GameCube games
Multiplayer and single-player video games
PlayStation 2 games
Rayman
Video games developed in France
Video games developed in Italy
Video games developed in China
Video games with alternative versions
Windows games
Xbox games
RenderWare games